Lewis Watkins may refer to:

Lewis G. Watkins, U.S. Marine
Lewis Watkins (MP)